Baker Street is a 1965 musical with a book by Jerome Coopersmith and music and lyrics by Marian Grudeff and Raymond Jessel.

Background
Loosely based on the 1891 Sherlock Holmes story "A Scandal in Bohemia" by Arthur Conan Doyle with elements of "The Final Problem" and "The Empty House" as well, it is set in and around London in 1897, the year in which England celebrated the Diamond Jubilee of the reign of Queen Victoria (an event marked by an elaborate royal procession depicted by Bil Baird's marionettes). The musical veers from Conan Doyle's work in that Irene Adler becomes an associate of Holmes rather than his opponent, thus allowing an element of romance between the two.

Because of problems the show went through during out of town tryouts, Sheldon Harnick and Jerry Bock, the successful composing team of Fiddler on the Roof were brought in to contribute additional songs including "Cold Clear World" and "I Shall Miss You."   They also wrote "I'm In London Again" which was the first number for Irene Adler, but after opening night, this number (which can be heard on the cast album) was dropped and replaced by another Bock-Harnick composition, "Buffalo Belle" which had Irene Adler performing an elaborate Wild West number. Stereo Review Magazine's review described the score as being "Warmed-over Gilbert & Sullivan with a gelid sauce of Lerner & Loewe."

Productions
The musical opened on Broadway at the Broadway Theatre on February 16, 1965 running to October 30, and then transferred to the Martin Beck Theatre (now the Al Hirschfeld Theatre) on November 3, 1965, where it closed on November 14, 1965 after a total of 311 performances and six previews. Directed by Hal Prince, the cast included Fritz Weaver, Peter Sallis, Martin Gabel, Inga Swenson, Virginia Vestoff, Teddy Green, and, in supporting roles, Christopher Walken and Tommy Tune, both in their Broadway debuts.
  
Producer Alexander H. Cohen felt the show was such an event that he announced, prior to the opening, men would not be admitted unless they were clad in jackets and ties, and women would be allowed in only if they wore dresses. This policy quickly changed once the mixed reviews were in.

Cast

The following list includes the roles in the musical and the cast members in the 1965 production. The production also included additional ensemble cast members and understudies.

Musical numbers

Act I
 "It's So Simple" – Holmes, Watson, Lestrade, Captain Gregg
 "I'm in London Again" – Irene
 "Leave it to Us, Guv" – Wiggins, The Irregulars
 "Letters" – Irene
 "Cold, Clear World" – Holmes
 "Finding Words for Spring" – Irene
 "What a Night This is Going to Be" – Holmes, Watson, Irene, Daisy
 "London Underworld" – Company
 "I Shall Miss You" – Moriarty

Act II
 "Roof Space" – Wiggins, The Irregulars
 "A Married Man" – Watson
 "I'd Do it Again" –  Irene
 "Pursuit" – Holmes
 "Jewelry" – Baxter, Criminals

Awards and nominations

Original Broadway production

References

External links
 
Tams-Witmark listing for production and licensing information
 Ballroom costume sketch by Motley Theatre Design Group -- Motley Collection of Theatre & Costume Design
A Musical Stroll Down Baker Street - episode of I Hear of Sherlock Everywhere featuring an interview with Fritz Weaver

1965 musicals
Broadway musicals
Fiction set in 1897
Musicals based on short fiction
Musicals by Jerry Bock
Musicals by Sheldon Harnick
Plays set in London
Tony Award-winning musicals
Works based on Sherlock Holmes